The Bike Ride, Bike Round or Boy on the Bike is a 1973 advert for the bread maker Hovis. It was directed by Ridley Scott.

Production 
Boy on the Bike was one of five adverts that Ridley Scott directed for Hovis in the early 70s.

The advert shows a boy (played by Carl Barlow) pushing his bicycle laden with loaves of bread up a picturesque English cobbled street. A voice over, presumably of the boy at a later age, nostalgically describes the trip  while a recording of Dvořák's Symphony No. 9 "From the New World" is played by the Ashington Colliery Band. 

Despite the common belief that it was set in the North of England, the advert was filmed on Gold Hill, Shaftesbury in Dorset and the voice-over is also narrated in a West Country accent. The misidentification of location could possibly be because of the strong association of brass bands with "northernness". One reason, for the choice of location, being that the street, and its tumbledown cottages with steep eaves, embodies 'Merry Old England', adding to the nostalgia of the piece.

Reception 
It has repeatedly been named one of Britain's most loved adverts. In 2006 it was voted the nation's favourite advertisements of all time. It was chosen as the best advert of the 70's in a 2018 YouGov poll. In 2019 it was named the 'most iconic' advert of the past 60 years to that point.

The advert's popularity has been put down to its nostalgia for 'wholesome images of village life', as well Scott's visual direction. Gold Hill, where the advert was filmed, has been a popular location for films and merchandise since and a memorial to Hovis now stands at the top of the hill.

Hovis and the BFI restored the advert for use in 2019 in an attempt to unite a divided nation. It was criticised for reminding those who voted to remain Brexit referendum  of how little they had in common with those who voted to leave.

References

Citations

Bibliography

External links 
 

1973 in British television
1973 works
1970s television commercials
Films directed by Ridley Scott
British television commercials